Heydarabad-e Ali Mardani (also Romanized as Ḩeydarābād-e ʿAlī Mardānī; also known as Ḩeydarābād) is a village in Vardasht Rural District, in the Central District of Semirom County, Isfahan Province, Iran. At the 2006 census, its population was 848, in 179 families.

References 

Populated places in Semirom County